This is a list of battles and wars of Frisia or Friesland.

The historical context is as follows:
600-734 Frisian Dukes
734-1156 Frankish rule
1156-1498 time of Frisian freedom
1498-1744 rule by dukes and Stadtholders.

List

Early battles
 28 - Battle of Baduhenna Wood, against the Romans
 ca 450 - Battle of Finnburg, legendary battle of king Finn against the Danes
 ca 525 - Battle on the Rhine, against the Danes

The Age of the Kings 
 Frisian–Frankish wars
 689 - Battle of Dorestad
 716 - Battle of Cologne
 716 - Battle of Amblève
 734 - Battle of the Boarn

the Age of the Franks 
 873 - Battle of Dokkum / Battle of Oostergo against the Vikings.
 884 - Battle of Norditi, against the Vikings.
 993 - Battle of Winkel, rebellion against Arnulf, Count of Holland
 1018 - Battle of Vlaardingen, Dirk III, Count of Holland against the Holy Roman Emperor

Frisian freedom 
   1076 - Battle of Iselmonde
   1151 - Battle of Mildeburch, Nordfrisian against the Danes
   1252 - Battle of Oldenswort, against the king of Danmark 
   1254 - Battle of Sieverner Specken, against the knights of Bederkesa and Holsel
   1256 - Battle of Heechwâld, against the count of Holland
   1282 - Battle of Schellinkhout, against the count of Holland
   1297 - Battle of Froanen, against the count of Holland
   1340 - Conquest of the Sibetsburg by the Wursten Frisians
   1344 - Battle of Langsundtoft, against the Danes
   1345 - Battle of Warns, against the count of Holland
   1380 - Battle of Arum, muontsen fan it kleaster Ludingatsjerke tsjin dy fan it Aldekleaster
   1380 - Battle of Loppersum, House Abdena vs. House Tom Brok
   1392 - Conquest of Ritzebüttel-Cuxhaven castle by the Wursten Frisians
   1396 - Battle of Schoterzijl, against the count of Holland

Crusades  

   1218 - Fifth Crusade, Frisian crusaders against Damietta
   1270 - Eighth Crusade, Frisian crusaders against the Moors

Vetkopers and Schieringers 

   1397 - Battle op de Menamer-mieden
   1429 - Battle of Sondel 
   1457 - Battle of Westerstede, against Oldenburg
   1463 - Battle of Mounesyl, battle during the Donia war
   1492 - Battle of Barrahuis

The Great Frisian War 

   1417 - Battle of Okswerderzijl, Sikke Sjaarda against Keno II tom Brok 
   1418 - Battle of Dokkum, Skieringers against Fokko Ukena  
   1419 - Battle of Miedum, Vetkoppers against Sikke Sjaarda 
   1420 - Battle near the Paelesleat, Sikke Sjaarda against Fokko Ukena  
   1420 - Battle of Sloten, Schieringers against Fokko Ukena

East Frisia liberty wars 

   1426 - Battle of Detern, Fokko Ukena against Okko tom Brok
   1427 - Battle of the Wild Fields, Fokko Ukena against Okko tom Brok
   1433 - Battle of Bargebur, Fokko Ukena against Ulrich Cirksena

Division of Friesland 
   1496 - Battle of Sleat, 
   1498 - Battle of Laaxum, against Albert III, Duke of Saxony
   1500 - Battle of Bomstersyl, against Albert III, Duke of Saxony
   1514 - Battle of Hartwarden, against the count of Bremen (Christopher the Spendthrift of Brunswick and Lunenburg (Wolfenbüttel))

Saxon feud 

   1514 - Battle of Appingedam, Edzard the Great against the Holy Roman Empire
   1515-1517 - rebellion of Grutte Pier, against the Dutch and Saxony
   1517 - Battle of the Wremer Djip, resulting in the death of Tjede Peckes
   1524 - Battle of Mulsum, last battle of the Land of Wursten against the archbishop of Bremen at Mulsum

Eighty Years' War 
   1568 - Battle of Heiligerlee, against the Spanish
   1568 - Battle of Jemgum, against the Spanish 
   1586 - Battle of Boksum, against the Spanish

References 

Frisian
Wars involving Frisia
History of Friesland